Gibberula falsijaponica is a species of sea snail, a marine gastropod mollusk, in the family Cystiscidae.

References

 Higo, S., Callomon, P. & Goto, Y. (1999). Catalogue and bibliography of the marine shell-bearing Mollusca of Japan. Osaka. : Elle Scientific Publications. 749 pp.

falsijaponica
Gastropods described in 1961